Szeliga is a village in Poland.

Szeliga may also refer to:
Szeliga (surname)
Szeliga coat of arms